Farrukhan the Great (Persian: فرخان بزرگ, Farrukhan-e Bozorg;  712–728) was the independent ruler (ispahbadh) of Tabaristan in the early 8th century, until his death in 728. He is the first actually attested (through his coinage) member of the Dabuyid dynasty, which is traditionally held to have ruled Tabaristan since the time of the Arab conquest of Iran. He successfully defended his realm against the Umayyad Arabs and Turks in the east and Daylamites in the west. He was also notable for being an active builder, constructing the city of Sari, where he moved his court.

He was succeeded by his eldest son, Dadhburzmihr.

Background 
Literary sources are very scarce on the Dabuyid dynasty. They are mainly known through the local histories of Ibn Isfandiyar and Zahir al-Din Mar'ashi (d. after 1489), while they only get briefly mentioned by early Islamic-era historians such as Khalifah ibn Khayyat (d. 854), al-Tabari (d. 923), and Ali ibn al-Athir (d. 1233); or by geographers such as Ibn al-Faqih and Ibn Khurdadbih (d. 912). According to both Ibn Isfandiyar and Mar'ashi, the Dabuyids were descendants of the royal Sasanian family, tracing their descent back to Jamasp.

According to the traditional account, the Dabuyids had established themselves as the autonomous rulers of Tabaristan in the 640s, during the tumults of the Muslim conquest of Persia and the collapse of the Sasanian Empire. They owed only the payment tribute and nominal vassalage to the Arab Caliphate, and managed, despite repeated Muslim attempts at invasion, to maintain their autonomy by exploiting the inaccessible terrain of their country. A more recent interpretation of the sources by P. Pourshariati, however, supports that Farrukhan the Great was the one who actually established the family's rule over Tabaristan, sometime in the 670s.

Although the Dabuyids were the suzerains of Gilan and Daylam, they ruled only in name, with local chieftains and kings being its virtual rulers. This likewise applied to the mountains of Tabaristan, which was ruled by two local dynasties, the Qarinvandids and Bavandids. The Dabuyids only exercised direct rule over Ruyan and the valleys of Tabaristan as far as Tammisha. The neighbouring eastern region of Gurgan was ruled by a marzban (margrave).

Reign 

Farrukhan is also known to have with the Turks sometime during his reign. He had initially made an agreement with them that they would stop making incursions into Tabaristan in return for tribute. Two years later, after having fortified the passages into Tabaristan, Farrukhan stopped paying tribute. He subsequently withdrew to Firuzabad (near Lafur) where he fortified himself. An invasion by the Turks soon followed, but Farrukhan inflicted a heavy defeat on them at night, killing all of them. Not much later, Farrukhan's Daylamite subjects revolted against him, forcing him to flee to Amul, where he fortified himself in a castle named Firuz-Khusra. The castle was soon besieged by the Daylamites, who hoped to starve Farrukhan and his garrison. Farrukhan ordered the inhabitants to shape clay to look like loaves of bread, and to put them on the walls. The Daylamites, seeing the loaves, became discouraged on the thought of being able to starve out such a well provisioned place, and thus lifted their siege and withdrew to Daylam.

In 716, the Arab governor of Iraq and Khurasan, Yazid ibn al-Muhallab invaded Tabaristan with the intent to conquer it. He was initially successful in his efforts, defeating Farrukhan, while seizing Dihistan and Gurgan. However, Farrukhan soon recruited the Daylamites and Gilites and defeated the Arabs. He then the inhabitants of Gurgan to revolt against the Arab garrison. The Arab garrison was subsequently massacred, including fifty members of Yazid's family. Yazid, who had reportedly become desperate, made a treaty with Farrukhan, agreeing to withdraw in return for tribute. The following year (717), the caliph Umar II had Yazid dismissed and imprisoned.

Contributions
Regarding the founding of Saruyeh (modern-day Sari), Ibn Isfandiyar wrote that Farrukhan ordered a person named "Bav" to build a city in a rural place called "Ohar". That position was on a high position and had many springs. People bribed Bav to build the city elsewhere. Bav accepted and built a city that is now called Sari. After the construction of the city was completed, Farrukhan the Great went there to visit, and after the "betrayal" of Bav was determined, he was hanged. However, the resulting city was named after one of the sons of Farrukhan, Saruya, and was known as this city for a long time. As in the reign of Shahriyar IV, coins dated 1106 have been struck with the name "Saruya" written on them. Next to the city of Sari, Farrukhan built a palace for himself which was called "Shahr-e Espahbodan" or "Espahbodan". The city of Espahbodan was apparently located between the cities of Sari and Amol, and was also two miles from the sea.

Coinage 

Farrukhan is the first Dabuyid ruler whose coins are known. He imitated the coinage of the Sasanian King of Kings (shahanshah) Khosrow II, albeit with some minor changes. His coins weighed half of the Sasanian coins, being around 2.05 grams. The legend was written in Middle Persian. On the obverse, Farrukhan is wearing a crown with two wings attached to it, which is a reference to Verethragna, the god of victory. The following rulers, Dadhburzmihr and Khurshid continued to mint the same pattern of coins, and eventually the Abbasid governors of Tabaristan.

Issue 
Farrukhan had 3 sons;
 Dadhburzmihr.
 Farrukhan the Little
 Saruya

References

Sources 
 	
 
 
 
 
 
 
 
 
 

7th-century births
728 deaths
8th-century rulers in Asia
8th-century Iranian people
Dabuyid dynasty
Slave owners